Norma González Camilde (born 11 August 1982, in Santander de Quilichao, Cauca) is a Colombian sprinter.

Career
At the 2012 Summer Olympics, she competed in the Women's 200 metres and was part of the Colombian 4 x 100 metre team.

Personal bests
100 metres – 11.54 (+0.2) (Cali 2002)
200 metres – 22.90 (+0.7) (Armenia, COL 2005)
400 metres – 51.58 (São Paulo 2011)

Competition record

References

External links
IAAF profile

Colombian female sprinters
1982 births
Living people
Olympic athletes of Colombia
Athletes (track and field) at the 2000 Summer Olympics
Athletes (track and field) at the 2004 Summer Olympics
Athletes (track and field) at the 2012 Summer Olympics
Pan American Games medalists in athletics (track and field)
Pan American Games bronze medalists for Colombia
Athletes (track and field) at the 1999 Pan American Games
Athletes (track and field) at the 2011 Pan American Games
Central American and Caribbean Games silver medalists for Colombia
Central American and Caribbean Games bronze medalists for Colombia
Competitors at the 2002 Central American and Caribbean Games
Competitors at the 2006 Central American and Caribbean Games
Competitors at the 2010 Central American and Caribbean Games
Competitors at the 2014 Central American and Caribbean Games
Central American and Caribbean Games medalists in athletics
Medalists at the 2011 Pan American Games
Olympic female sprinters
Sportspeople from Cauca Department
21st-century Colombian women